Esslemont railway station was a railway station in Esslemont, Aberdeenshire.

History
The station was opened on 18 July 1861 by the Formartine and Buchan Railway. To the south was the goods yard. It initially had one platform but a second one was added in 1919. The station closed on 15 September 1952.

References

Sources
 
 
 RAILSCOT on Formartine and Buchan Railway

Disused railway stations in Aberdeenshire
Former Great North of Scotland Railway stations
Railway stations in Great Britain opened in 1861
Railway stations in Great Britain closed in 1952
1861 establishments in Scotland
1952 disestablishments in Scotland